Rosalía Mera Goyenechea (28 January 1944 – 15 August 2013) was a Spanish businesswoman and entrepreneur. At the time of her death, she was the richest woman in Spain and the world's richest self-made woman.  In 1975, she co-founded the Zara retail chain with her then-husband Amancio Ortega Gaona. The company grew to become the world's largest fashion retailer.

Early life and education
Rosalia Mera Goyenechea was born in A Coruña, Galicia, Spain on 28 January 1944. She dropped out of school at age eleven to work as a sales assistant in a clothing shop.

Career
Mera began designing gowns and lingerie in her home with her then-husband, Amancio Ortega Gaona. The couple opened the first Zara store in 1975 in A Coruña.  Eventually the couple parlayed their work into a multi-billion dollar enterprise. Zara's success was in part due to its strategy of imitating popular fashions and quickly making them for sale at inexpensive prices.

Ten years after the opening of the first Zara store, Inditex was established as a holding company for the couple's businesses. Inditex now comprises multiple fashion companies, of which Zara is the flagship.  The company also owns the retailers Bershka, Massimo Dutti, Oysho, Pull & Bear, Stradivarius, Uterque and Zara Home. Inditex now has over 6000+ stores in over 86 countries  and over 120,000 employees. Despite her 1986 divorce from Ortega, Mera retained a 7% stake in the company.

Mera also owned interests in a company which made fingerprinting identification kits for newborns and another company, Zeltia, which carries out research into cancer fighting compounds of both synthetic and natural origin and particularly those bioactive compounds originating in the ocean.

According to the 2013 Forbes billionaire list, Mera was the world's wealthiest self-made female entrepreneur, with a net worth of over $6 billion.  She was the second-wealthiest person from Spain, second only to her ex-husband.

Political and philanthropic activities
Mera opposed conservative Prime Minister Mariano Rajoy's plans to make Spain's abortion laws more restrictive. She also opposed austerity cutbacks to Spain's national healthcare and education programmes.

Mera established the Paideia Foundation which works with groups in risk of social exclusion.

Personal life
Mera married Amancio Ortega Gaona in 1966.  The couple had a daughter, Sandra in 1968. and also had a son, Marcos in 1971, who was born with cerebral palsy. The couple divorced in 1986.

Death
On 14 August 2013, Mera was admitted to a hospital in Menorca in an ‘irreversible situation’ after suffering a stroke. The family had been on holiday in Menorca. Mera died on 15 August 2013 in A Coruña. She had been transferred by plane to the port city and then by ambulance to the Hospital San Rafael de A Coruña where she later died of complications. Inditex confirmed Mera's death on 16 August 2013, stating "The group wishes to send its sincere condolences to her loved ones and friends at this extremely difficult time, after the loss of a person who contributed so much to the origins and development of the company." She was buried in the cemetery of the church of Santa Eulalia of Liáns, in Oleiros (A Coruña).

Her daughter Sandra Ortega Mera inherited her wealth, and became Spain's richest woman with a net wealth of $6.1 billion.

References

1944 births
2013 deaths
Female billionaires
People from A Coruña
Spanish billionaires
Businesspeople from Galicia (Spain)
21st-century Spanish businesswomen
21st-century Spanish businesspeople
20th-century Spanish businesswomen
20th-century Spanish businesspeople